Jeff van Dyck, known as simply Jeff Dyck in his early years, is a Canadian-Australian video game composer. Born and raised in Vancouver, van Dyck started to become known in the video game music industry in 1992, when he was working with Electronic Arts (EA) for several sports game franchises, such as the Need for Speed series, together with Saki Kaskas. After his stint with EA, van Dyck moved to Australia and became the composer for the Total War franchise by Creative Assembly. During his collaboration with the video game developer, van Dyck won a British Academy of Film and Television Arts Award (2001) and garnered a nomination (2005). As composer and audio director Total War: Shogun 2: Fall of the Samurai, he was nominated for the "Audio Achievement" section of the Develop awards in May 2012. In 2014 again as audio director, his team won a BAFTA for Alien: Isolation. Van Dyck is a partner in the Brisbane based indie developers Witch Beam (Assault Android Cactus, Unpacking) and EarthWork Games (Forts).

Prominent works 
Unpacking
Paint the Town Red
Submerged: Hidden Depths
Forts
Skyward Journey
Hand of Fate 2
Submerged
Hand of Fate
Alien: Isolation
Vega Conflict
Assault Android Cactus
Total War: Shogun 2: Fall of the Samurai
Total War: Shogun 2
Rome: Total War and its expansions, Barbarian Invasion, Alexander
Medieval: Total War and its expansion, Viking Invasion
Medieval 2: Total War and its expansion, Kingdoms
Shogun: Total War and its expansion, Mongol Invasion
Spartan: Total Warrior
Emperor: Rise of the Middle Kingdom
Tiger Woods PGA Tour 2004
The Need for Speed and Need for Speed II
FIFA Soccer
NHL Hockey
AFL 99
Sled Storm
Skitchin'
Stormrise

Awards 
BAFTA Interactive Entertainment Award Winner in the category 'Interactive | Music in 2001' for Shogun Total War: Warlord Edition
BAFTA 2005 Nomination for Video Game Original Soundtrack, Rome: Total War

References

External links 
Official Jeff van Dyck website

Living people
Video game composers
Canadian people of Australian descent
Canadian people of Dutch descent
Australian people of Dutch descent
Year of birth missing (living people)